The 1995 Source Awards was held at the Paramount Theater in New York City, New York on August 3, 1995.

Suge Knight spent over $100,000 for the set of the Death Row Records live performances. It was the first year that the program was nationally syndicated and televised.

Winners and nominees
Winners are in bold text.

Artist of the Year (group)
 Wu-Tang Clan
 Salt-N-Pepa
 Gang Starr
 Heavy D & the Boyz

Artist of the Year (solo)
 Snoop Doggy Dogg
 Scarface
 Queen Latifah
 MC Eiht

New Artist of the Year (group)
 Outkast
 Bone Thugs-n-Harmony
 Ill Al Skratch
 Smif-N-Wessun

New Artist of the Year (solo)
 The Notorious B.I.G.
 Warren G
 Method Man
 Da Brat

Lyricist of the Year (group or solo)
 The Notorious B.I.G.
 Redman
 Nas
 Big Mike

Rap Album of the Year
 The Notorious B.I.G. – Ready to Die
 Nas – Illmatic
 Outkast – Southernplayalisticadillacmuzik
 Scarface – The Diary

Single of the Year
 Craig Mack – Flava in Ya Ear
 Bone Thugs-n-Harmony – Thuggish Ruggish Bone
 The Lady of Rage – Afro Puffs
 Warren G featuring Nate Dogg – Regulate

Motion Picture Soundtrack of the Year
 Above the Rim
 Jason's Lyric
 Murder was the Case
 Poetic Justice

Acting Performance, Movie or TV
 Ice Cube – Higher Learning

R&B Artist of the Year
 Mary J. Blige
 TLC
 Brandy
 R. Kelly

Producer of the Year
 Dr. Dre
 DJ Premier
 Easy Mo Bee
 Pete Rock

Reggae/Hip-Hop Artist of the Year
 Mad Lion

Live Performer of the Year (group or solo)
 The Notorious B.I.G.

Video of the Year
 Dr. Dre and Ice Cube – Natural Born Killaz
 Craig Mack – Flava in Ya Ear
 Snoop Dogg – Murder Was the Case
 Coolio – Fantastic Voyage

Lifetime Achievement Award
 Eazy-E

Pioneer Award
 Run-DMC

Performances
 Craig Mack – "Flava in Ya Ear"
 Faith Evans – "You Used to Love Me"
 Total – "Can't You See"
 Junior M.A.F.I.A. featuring The Notorious B.I.G. – "Player's Anthem"
 The Notorious B.I.G. – "One More Chance"
 Da Brat – "Give It 2 You"
 Method Man – "Bring the Pain"
 Dr. Dre – "Keep Their Heads Ringin'"
 Tha Dogg Pound – "What Would You Do?"
 The Lady of Rage – "Afro Puffs"
 Sam Sneed – "U Better Recognize"
 DJ Quik – "Dollaz + Sense"
 Snoop Doggy Dogg – "Murder Was the Case"
 Bone Thugs-n-Harmony – "Thuggish Ruggish Bone"
 Bone Thugs-n-Harmony – "Foe tha Love of $"
 Bone Thugs-n-Harmony – "1st of tha Month"

References

The Source Awards, 1995
1995 in American music
1995 awards in the United States
1995 in New York City